The 1993 UCI Mountain Bike World Championships were held in Métabief, France from 17 to 18 September 1993.

Medal summary

Men's events

Women's events

Medal table

References

External links

UCI Mountain Bike World Championships
1993 UCI Mountain Bike World Championships
UCI Mountain Bike World Championships
Mountain biking events in France